Room for Rent is a Canadian comedy/mystery film written and directed by Matt Atkinson. It stars Brett Gelman, Mark Little, Carla Gallo, Stephnie Weir, Patrick J. Adams, and Mark McKinney.

It had its world premiere at the Atlantic Film Festival on September 16, 2017, won awards for its 2017 showings at the LA Comedy Festival and Chicago Comedy Festival and its 2018 showing at the Canadian Film Festival, and won three Canadian Comedy Awards when it opened theatrically in Canada on October 26, 2018. It was released to video on demand on November 2, 2018.

Plot
In high school, Mitch Baldwin won the lottery and blew all the cash.  Twelve years later, he's holed up living with his parents when his dad says they have to downsize their house so he can retire.  Mitch insists they rent a room to save from selling their home.  Enter Carl Lemay.  Carl at first seems like the perfect renter but when he begins upsetting Mitch's routine way of life, a battle of wits turns into all out war.

Cast

Production
Principal photography took place in Winnipeg, Canada in June 2016.

Release
The film had its world premiere at the Atlantic Film Festival on September 16, 2017. This was followed by its US Premiere at the San Diego International Film Festival on October 16, 2017, and its Asian premiere at the Shanghai International Film Festival on June 19, 2018.

The film opened theatrically in Canada on October 26, 2018.

Gunpowder & Sky released the film in the US to video on demand platforms on November 2, 2018.

Reception
The film has an 88% rating on Rotten Tomatoes.  Alan Ng of Film Threat awarded the film three and a half stars out of five.  Norm Wilner of NOW Toronto awarded the film three stars out of five.

Awards and recognition

References

External links 
 
 
 
 Room for Rent at Library and Archives Canada

2017 films
Canadian comedy films
English-language Canadian films
2010s English-language films
2010s Canadian films